"Bang Bang" is a 1989 song by the American glam metal band Danger Danger. It was the fifth track on the band's eponymous debut album, Danger Danger. It was written by band bassist Bruno Ravel and drummer Steve West.

Danger Danger's second single, it peaked at No. 39 on the Billboard Mainstream Rock Tracks chart and No. 49 on the Billboard Hot 100 chart in 1990. It was the band's only single to chart in the United States.

The song's music video was popular, making the MTV Video Countdown Top Ten.

Weekly Charts

References

1989 songs
1990 singles
Epic Records singles
1989 singles